The Ukrainian command ship Slavutych is a former Soviet auxiliary ship Pridneprovie of the Gofri-class intelligence ships (NATO codename: Bambuk) ship built for the Soviet Navy in the late 1980s.

Description
The ship was designed by the Central Design Bureau "Chernomorets" in Sevastopol, Ukrainian SSR initially for the purpose to serve the nuclear submarines of the Soviet Northern Fleet. It was planned to realize the project based on a big refrigerated fishing trawler (BMRT) project 1288 and placed in a dock of the Black Sea Shipyard as a special ship SSV-189. Due to dissolution of the Soviet Union, the construction was abandoned and continued by the newly formed early administration of the Ukrainian Navy. It was decided to reequip the warship as a big spy ship project 1288.4 as "Prydniprovia".

Ukrainian service
On the Ukrainian independence day 24 August 1992 the former Pridneprovie was renamed Slavutych and commissioned into the Ukrainian Navy. In 1994 its identification number was switched from 800 to U510.

Fate
Slavutych was captured by Russians forces during the 2014 Russian annexation of Crimea. The ship was not returned to Ukrainian authorities

See also

References

External links
 U-510 Slavutich. BLACK SEA – HISTORY OF VISITS

1988 ships
Ships built at the Black Sea Shipyard
Ships built in the Soviet Union
Slavutych
Vessels captured from the Ukrainian Navy